AGH-107 is a potent, selective, water-soluble and brain penetrant full agonist at the 5HT7 serotonin receptor. AGH-107 is one of the few examples of low-basicity aminergic receptor agonists, which may underlie its high selectivity over the related central nervous system targets. AGH-107 was found to reverse the impairment in novel object recognition caused by MK-801 in mice. The relatively short half-life in rodents inhibited its use as a molecular probe.

See also 
 AH-494
 AGH-192

References 

Serotonin receptor agonists
Indoles
Iodoarenes
Imidazoles